Drew Edward Wright (born October 5, 1979) is a Canadian singer and musician, best known as a top three finalist on the sixth season of Canadian Idol.

Early life

Wright played in the band while a student at Admiral Collingwood Public School. Aged 15, he took up the guitar as his main instrument, which he plays right-handed despite being left-handed.

After leaving school, Wright attended Collingwood Collegiate Institute and enrolled in the drama program. For his year-end monologue, he played a character who wanted to write music for a living. Around this time, he played in a short-lived band called Clean Dirt, then formed another band called Malleus, who won the Rock 95 Loud and Local Contest in 2006.

After graduating high school, Wright earned a degree in music engineering and continued performing on the local scene.

Canadian Idol
Wright was encouraged to try out for Canadian Idol by family and friends. He played an acoustic performance of Maroon 5's "She Will Be Loved" and made it into the Top 22.

After performing Queen's "Under Pressure", Neverending White Lights's "The Grace" and Hoobastank's "The Reason" (accompanying himself on guitar for the latter two), Wright advanced into the Top 10.

Wright accompanied himself on drums during Top 10-week, playing David Bowie's "Five Years". Though the judges' responses to his performances were mostly lukewarm, he advanced to the next round.

For Top 9-week, he sang Blind Melon's "No Rain" without accompanying himself on an instrument. The contestants were mentored by Gavin Rossdale for Top 8-week, when he again sang a Maroon 5 song, "Sunday Morning". 

Wright accompanied himself on an electric guitar for Top 7-week, singing Radiohead's 1992 hit, "Creep". The judges were largely happy with the performance, though judge Zack Werner commented that he could have "sang the lyrics a bit more angst-ridden."

The following week, Simple Plan mentored the contestants for 'Canadian Artists' week, in which Wright chose Big Wreck's "That Song". After a mixed response from the judging panel, Wright placed in the bottom three the next night with Earl Stevenson and Amberly Thiessen, who was eliminated.

The top five went to Camp Oochigeas. Wright described the visit as "unreal" and said his worries seemed "extremely trivial with what these kids are going through". For that week, the judges chose songs for the contestants to sing by The Beatles. Singing "While My Guitar Gently Weeps", Wright received praise from all four judges, but finished in the bottom two with Mookie Morris, who was then eliminated.

On August 22, Wright returned home to Collingwood for a welcome home party. He sang full-length versions of "That Song", "Creep" and "Under Pressure", as well as Tonic's "Open Up Your Eyes", Jeff Buckley's "Hallelujah" and U2's "Where The Streets Have No Name".

That week on the show, Anne Murray mentored and Wright sang her song "Hey Daddy" as well as John Mayer's "Gravity". 

For his final week on the show, themed around Bryan Adams songs, Wright sang his own arrangement of "Cuts Like a Knife" and "I'm Ready". The next night, Wright was eliminated despite praise from the judges.

Wright said he was not surprised to be eliminated, but was happy to leave on a high note and felt very positive about the Top 2 finalists Mitch MacDonald and Theo Tams.

Following the show, the top three were sent on a three-month, cross-Canada tour.

Career

Fall and Divide
Immediately following Canadian Idol, Wright formed a band called Fall and Divide, which "comes from the state the planet is in right now and also from the separation from the demographic of Canadian Idol." After several line-up changes, the band released their debut album digitally through iTunes and Amazon MP3 on October 3, 2011. On March 26, 2013, Fall and Divide announced on their Facebook page that they had disbanded.

Discography
In Time – released on April 20, 2007 (with Malleus)
Fall and Divide – released on October 3, 2011 (digital) (with Fall and Divide)

References

External links
Fall and Divide website
Drew Wright on Myspace

1979 births
Canadian Idol participants
Living people
Musicians from Toronto
People from Collingwood, Ontario
21st-century Canadian male singers